Careless Lady is a 1932 American comedy film directed by Kenneth MacKenna and written by Guy Bolton. The film stars Joan Bennett, John Boles, Minna Gombell, Weldon Heyburn, Nora Lane and Raul Roulien. The film was released on April 3, 1932, by Fox Film Corporation.

Cast        
Joan Bennett as Sally Brown
John Boles as Stephen Illington
Minna Gombell as Yvette Logan
Weldon Heyburn as Jud Carey
Nora Lane as Ardis Delafield
Raul Roulien as Luis Pareda
J. M. Kerrigan as Trowbridge
John Arledge as Hank Oldfield
Fortunio Bonanova as Rodriguez
Josephine Hull as Aunt Cora
Martha Mattox as Aunt Della
William Pawley as Police Captain
James Kirkwood, Sr. as Judge
Maude Turner Gordon as Mrs. Cartwright
Richard Tucker as Captain Gerard
André Cheron as Konstantos
James Todd as Peter Towne
Howard Phillips as Jack Merre 
Marcelle Corday as Marie 
Louis Mercier as Chauffeur

References

External links 
 
 

1932 films
Fox Film films
American comedy films
1932 comedy films
American black-and-white films
1930s English-language films
Films directed by Kenneth MacKenna
1930s American films